Some animals suffer from shortsightedness and have poor eyesight. In domestic animals, myopia, with or without astigmatism, occurs frequently.

In cats 
Evolved for low-light hunting, cats' eyes are proportionally enormous. Their eye size makes focusing between near and far so difficult that the muscles develop with an environmental bias. Outdoor cats tend to be farsighted, while most indoor cats are nearsighted but not myopic. Cats are unable to focus on anything less than a foot in front of them.

In dogs 
One animal species in which myopia occurs naturally is the domestic dog. Although the prevalence of myopia in dogs is breed dependent, approximately 8% to 15% of Labrador Retrievers are reported to have myopia.

In rhinoceroses 
Whereas the rhinoceros may suffer from less-than-adequate eyesight, it generally survives by concentrating with its superior hearing and sense of smell. Some reports, however state that it can see better when focusing with one eye, particularly when walking, posturing, and combatting.

Research 
Myopia, with or without astigmatism, is the most common eye condition in horses.
Several types of occlusion myopia have been recorded in tree shrews, macaques, cats and rats, deciphered from several animal-inducing myopia models. Preliminary laboratory investigations using retinoscopy of 240 dogs found myopic problems with varying degrees of refraction errors depending on the breed. In cases involving German Shepherds, Rottweilers and Miniature horses, the refraction errors were indicative of myopia. Nuclear sclerosis of the crystalline lens was noticed in older dogs.

Experiments into newborn macaque monkeys have revealed that surgically fusing the eyelid for one year results in eye deterioration as the eye has not had a chance to grow and develop. Keeping monkeys in the dark for a similar period, however, does not lead to myopia.  In 1996, Maurice and Mushin conducted tests on rabbits by raising their body temperatures and intraocular pressures (IOP) and noted that while younger rabbits were prone to developing myopia, older rabbits were not. Some tests have revealed that myopia in some animals can be improved with eye drops containing zinc, by increasing the activity of superoxide dismutase (SOD).

The rhesus monkey's vision amplitude reduction is noticeable in its second decade of life; however the condition does not impede normal functioning. Older rhesus monkeys have more difficulty accommodating this reduction in vision amplitude, encountering difficulty in focusing on objects at close range, even objects on the ground within an arm's length.

References

Disorders of ocular muscles, binocular movement, accommodation and refraction
Vision
Animal diseases